The Carnegie Library of Albany is a Carnegie library in Albany, Missouri, listed on the National Register of Historic Places. It was designed by Edmond J. Eckel and opened in 1906.

History
The city of Albany had a subscription library which operated from 1885 to about 1890. Because of renewed interested in having a public library, a grant was requested from Andrew Carnegie. A pledge of $10,000 was made on June 2, 1903, and a lot was purchased in July 1904. The building was designed by Edmond J. Eckel. After requesting bids in November 1905, Louis Walin was selected. The final bid was $9,071, which required further grant money from Carnegie, bringing the total donation to $12,500. The library opened to the public on March 1, 1906.

The library basement housed city hall from 1939 until the mid-1960s, and then the University of Missouri Extension Office. The building continues to serve as a library in Albany.

The library was nominated for inclusion on the National Register of Historic Places under Criterion A for its significance in social history as a Carnegie Library and Criterion C for its architecture. The library was listed on the National Register on February 23, 1990, as the "Albany Carnegie Public Library".

See also
National Register of Historic Places listings in Gentry County, Missouri
List of Carnegie libraries in Missouri

References

Bibliography

External links
 Libraries.org listing

Library buildings completed in 1906
Libraries on the National Register of Historic Places in Missouri
Neoclassical architecture in Missouri
Government buildings completed in 1906
Buildings and structures in Gentry County, Missouri
Carnegie libraries in Missouri
National Register of Historic Places in Gentry County, Missouri
1906 establishments in Missouri